Syed Modi (31 December 1962 – 28 July 1988), born as Syed Mehdi Hassan Zaidi, was an Indian badminton singles player. He was eight-time National Badminton champion (1980–1987). His most notable achievement at the international badminton circuit came in the form of men's singles title at the 1982 Commonwealth Games. He also won three other international titles, namely Austrian International (in 1983 & 1984) and USSR International (in 1985), both of which were European Badminton Circuit tournaments.

Modi's career was cut short in his prime when he was shot dead on 28 July 1988 in Lucknow as he came out of the K. D. Singh Babu Stadium after a practice session. The murder sent shockwaves through India, especially after the police filed murder charges against Modi's wife, Ameeta, and her lover (and future husband) Sanjay Sinh.

Early life and education
Syed Mahdi Hassan Zaidi was born in the town of Sardarnagar,  from Chauri Chaura in Uttar Pradesh. He grew up there, but his family hailed from Zaidi Sadat Kandipur (or Kadipur) near Jalalpur town in Ambedkar Nagar District, Uttar Pradesh. His father, Syed Meer Hassan Zaidi, worked in Sardarnagar sugar mill and his mother was a housewife. Syed Modi was the youngest of their eight children (six sons and two daughters). Modi's elder brothers were educated, but they worked and contributed significantly towards meeting family expenses and supporting Modi in his childhood, including for his badminton coaching, after it became clear that he had the potential to become a great player.

When Modi first began going to the local school, the person who entered his name in the school roster mistook his name "Mehdi" for the more common Indian surname "Modi" and wrote it down that way. As a result, this became his name in all educational and government records and he did not take the trouble to rectify the matter in adulthood. In school, Modi achieved only average grades in his academics but became a notable sportsman. He was very popular in school for his open, affectionate nature and bright good looks. His elder brothers doted on him and financed his training as required. Far from considering him a burden, they pinned their hopes on him earning a good name and bringing honour, pride and happiness to his parents in their old age, after a lifetime of poverty and struggle.

Career
Modi fulfilled their hopes and prayers during his short life. In 1976, aged only 14, Syed Modi became junior national Badminton champion.The same year, Modi started training under Mr. P.K. Bhandari (Pushp Kumar Bhandari – chief badminton coach, N.I.S, Patiala) which continued until 1982. Thereafter, he trained under Dipu Ghosh, National Coach of Indian team.

In 1980, as soon as he was eligible (aged 18), Modi won the national badminton championship. In the same year, the department of sports (Government of India) recommended his name, and Modi was given a paying job as a Welfare Officer in the Indian Railways (NE). He was initially posted in Gorakhpur, nearest to his hometown and family. In 1982, his new coach wanted that he should train in Lucknow which had better facilities, so he was transferred there.

Syed Modi went on to win the national badminton championship every single year between 1980 and 1987 (eight times in a row). In 1981, he received the Arjuna Award from the Government of India. At the 1982 Asian Games, he won the bronze at the men's singles event. The same year (1982), he beat England's Nick Yates, 7–15, 15–5, 15–7 to take home the Men's singles Gold at the 1982 Commonwealth Games. In 1983 and 1984, he won the Australian International. His game started going downhill only in 1987–88 when his marriage came under strain (his wife was having an affair) and Modi lost the national badminton championship for the first time ever in 1988. A few months later, he was murdered.

Achievements

Commonwealth Games

Asian Games

IBF International

Invitational Tournaments

Personal life

Marriage
In 1978, while he was a junior national champion, the 16-year-old Modi was selected for participating in an international tournament to be held in Beijing, China. A girl badminton player of his own age named Ameeta Kulkarni was in the women's team, and, as the Supreme Court would later record, "there arose intimacy between the two." While Modi was a Muslim from north India, Ameeta was a Hindu from Maharashtra, had grown up in cosmopolitan Mumbai and came from an affluent, upper-class English-educated family, very different from Modi's own background. Both families were stridently opposed to marriage between Modi and Ameeta, not just because of the vast chasm in their backgrounds, but also because they anticipated that professional issues, jealousies, and oneupmanship would also become major factors in a marriage between two ambitious, target-oriented, over-achieving individuals. Indeed, the families remained opposed to the marriage even to the bitter end. However, Modi and Ameeta were adamant and got married in a registry office in a hastily arranged ceremony.

As soon as they had had their way and married each other, the couple began having problems. Behavioural expectations and professional jealousies have been identified conclusively, but religious issues have also been hinted at in a Central Bureau of Investigation (CBI) report. Most important was the element of love jihad as seen in all Hindu-Muslim relationships. Syed Modi wanted Ameetha to convert to Islam and Ameetha being a hardcore shiv Bhakti refused to do so. Not only this she decided not to become a victim and take matter into her own hands for the safety of herself and her religion belief. There was also the involvement of a third person. This was Sanjay Sinh, an immensely rich man, a classmate and friend of the then Prime Minister Rajiv Gandhi, and a prominent politician belonging to the ruling Congress party. Ameeta and Sanjay Sinh had come in contact with each other in 1984, under circumstances that are not clear. Sanjay Singh was a married man with two children, and Ameeta also had been married for several years to Modi, although they had no children yet. Modi began to suspect that his wife was having an affair with Singh, and for reasons that are unclear, Ameeta seems to have chosen to feed his fears rather than allay them. Knowing that Modi sometimes read her personal diary when she was away from home, Ameeta used to "tease" him by writing details of her relationship with Sanjay Singh in that diary. After Modi was murdered, the diary fell into the hands of the police, and Ameeta explained the incriminating contents of the dairy in the following words:

Matters came to a head when Ameeta became pregnant. According to the CBI report, Modi suspected that the child was not his, but was the result of Ameeta's affair with Singh. His wife did not feel disposed to allay these fears, and went to her parents' house in Mumbai for her confinement. A girl child was born in May 1988 and Ameeta gave her the Hindu name Aakanksha. She then left the infant with her parents in Mumbai and returned to Lucknow, supposedly in order to continue with her badminton practice and get back into form as soon as possible. Modi resented all of these circumstances, while Ameeta resented the fact that her badminton career was put on hold, while Syed continued to rack up titles, winning his eighth consecutive national trophy in 1987. However, personal issues had in fact taken a toll on Modi's sporting performance. He had recently lost the national trophy (1988), after having won it eight times in a row from 1980 to 1987.

Murder
Two months after the birth of his daughter, Syed Modi was murdered. On the evening of 28 July 1988, at the age of 26, Modi was shot dead as he was coming out of KD Singh Babu stadium, Lucknow after a routine practice. A brilliant career was cut short and a severe blow was dealt to badminton in India as Modi was touted to be a superstar like Prakash Padukone.

The scandal surrounding Modi's murder attracted worldwide attention. This was another case of a minority being murdered by the Majority group in India, this time over a marital dispute.  Seven were named in a chargesheet following a CBI probe, including Modi's wife Ameeta and her future husband, Sanjaya Sinh who were allegedly suspected of getting Syed murdered due to their extra-marital affair, but the case against Ameeta Modi and Sanjay Singh – for conspiracy – was dropped, and Akhilesh Singh and Jitendra Singh were separately exonerated. Sanjaya Sinh and Ameeta Modi later got married. Two of the other accused – Amar Bahadur Singh and Balai Singh – died before their involvement could be judged. Bhagwati Singh was found guilty of murder and possessing illegal arms, fined and sentenced to life imprisonment. The brutal murder left a wound in the public psyche. The CBI arrested Modi's adulterous wife and her lover within days of the murder, but the investigation was then scuttled by the government, according to retired investigating officers. The evidence included letters written by Ameeta's mother, regarding the paternity of Aakanksha, and also letters written during the engagement of Syed Modi and Ameeta in 1984 and later a letter where Syed Modi threatened to commit suicide.

Aftermath
Shortly after being released for lack of evidence, Modi's widow, Ameeta, married her long-time lover, Sanjay Singh. This marriage received sensational reportage in the press and became front-page news in India. Sanjay Singh's wife, Garima Singh, read of the wedding in the newspapers and filed a case in court stating that she had never been divorced from her husband and praying that the court declare his second marriage invalid (due to bigamy) and order restitution of her conjugal rights. Investigation revealed that Sanjay Singh had obtained a decree of divorce by stating a wrong address as his wife's residence. He had given the address of one of his several houses for that purpose, although Garima had not lived in that house for many years. The court had sent notice after notice to the wrong address, had received no response, and had granted an ex-parte divorce because the respondent had not appeared in court despite repeated summons. It appears that the court notices had been received at the wrong address by an associate of Sanjay Singh and had then been simply destroyed.

After Garima Singh filed her case, the sessions court heard the matter and, following a police report, set aside the order of divorce, thus invalidating the marriage of Sanjay Singh and Ameeta Modi. However, no criminal proceedings could be initiated against Sanjay Singh, because Garima Singh had in fact lived in the said house during the early years of her marriage, and it was not wholly impossible that she had received and ignored the summons. It was her word against his. Sanjay Singh then filed an appeal in the High Court, as also a fresh plea for divorce in the district court. Both of these cases are still pending in the courts over 20 years later (as of 2016). Meanwhile, Ameeta Modi and Sanjay Singh have been cohabiting for all intents and purposes as husband and wife. They have no children except Aakanksha, who has been formally adopted by Sanjay Singh.

Due to the sensational revelations and public and legal shenanigans, Sanjay Singh had to take a prolonged sabbatical from his political career. However, he not only returned to politics but also introduced Ameeta into the field. Modi's widow has stood for election to the state assembly from Amethi, which was formerly ruled by Sanjay Singh's family.

Memorial tournament
Although Modi's very name has been erased from his bloodline, and his daughter has been adopted by another man, Modi's name lives on in the field of badminton, which was his lifelong passion. After Modi's death, a badminton tournament was constituted in his memory. The All India Syed Modi badminton championship was hosted each year in Lucknow, which turned into "Syed Modi International Challenge" in 2004, and starting December 2009 it would turn into "Syed Modi Grand Prix", organized by Badminton Association of India. This event later transformed to Super 300 level tournament in the newly introduced BWF World Tour format since 2018 under the name of "Syed Modi International" and since 2020 as the Syed Modi India International". The Railways of which he was an employee, opened the Syed Modi Railway Stadium and auditorium at his native place, Gorakhpur.

Movie
Actor and director Dev Anand made a thriller movie based on the murder of Modi. Sau Crore was released in 1991 with the role of Modi being played by Raman Kapoor. The movie was a surprise hit at the box office.
A new ZEE5 web series Chargesheet is based on the sensational murder of Syed Modi.

References

External links

1962 births
1988 deaths
1988 murders in Asia
20th-century Indian Muslims
People from Gorakhpur
Indian male badminton players
Deaths by firearm in India
Indian murder victims
People murdered in Uttar Pradesh
Indian national badminton champions
Recipients of the Arjuna Award
Commonwealth Games gold medallists for India
Badminton players at the 1982 Commonwealth Games
Asian Games medalists in badminton
Male murder victims
Badminton players at the 1982 Asian Games
Badminton players at the 1986 Asian Games
Asian Games bronze medalists for India
Commonwealth Games medallists in badminton
Medalists at the 1982 Asian Games
Medalists at the 1986 Asian Games
Medallists at the 1982 Commonwealth Games